Carlo Maratta or Maratti (13 May 162515 December 1713) was an Italian painter, active mostly in Rome, and known principally for his classicizing paintings executed in a Late Baroque Classical manner. Although he is part of the classical tradition stemming from Raphael, he was not exempt from the influence of Baroque painting and particularly in his use of colour. His contemporary and friend, Giovanni Bellori, wrote an early biography on Maratta.

Biography
Born in Camerano (Marche), then part of the Papal States, Maratta went to Rome in 1636, accompanied by, Don Corintio Benicampi, secretary to Taddeo Barberini. He became an apprentice in the studio of Andrea Sacchi. It was at this time that the debate between Sacchi and Pietro da Cortona took place at the Accademia di San Luca, the artists academy in Rome. Sacchi argued that paintings should only have a few figures which should express the narrative whereas Cortona countered that a greater number of figures allowed for the development of sub themes. Maratta's painting at this time was closely allied with the classicism of Sacchi and was far more restrained and composed than the Baroque exuberance of Pietro da Cortona’s paintings. Like Sacchi, his paintings were inspired by the works of the great painters from Parma and Bologna: Annibale Carracci, Guercino, Guido Reni, Francesco Albani, and Giovanni Lanfranco.

He developed a close relationship with Sacchi till the death of his master in 1661. His fresco of  'Constantine ordering the Destruction of Pagan Idols' (1648) for the Baptistery of the Lateran, based on designs by Sacchi, gained him attention as an artist but his first prominent independent work was the 'Adoration of the Shepherds' (1650) for San Giuseppe di  Falegnami. Another major work from this period was 'The Mystery of the Trinity Revealed to St. Augustine' (c. 1655) painted for the church of Santa Maria dei Sette Dolori. 
 
Pope Alexander VII (reigned 1655–1667) commissioned many paintings from him including The Visitation  (1656) for Santa Maria della Pace and the Nativity in the gallery of the Quirinal Palace where he worked under the direction of Cortona who selected him for this task.  His pictures of the late 1650s exhibit light and movement derived from Roman Baroque painting, combined with classical idealism. 

From 1660, he built up a private client base amongst wealthy patrons of Europe,  establishing  the most prominent art studio in Rome of his time and, after the death of Bernini in 1680, he became the leading artist in Rome. In 1664, Maratta became the director of the Accademia di San Luca and, concerned with elevating the status of artists, promoted the study and drawing of the art of Classical Antiquity. During the 1670s he was commissioned by  Pope Clement X to fresco the ceiling of the salone in the Palazzo Altieri; the iconographic programme for The Triumph of Clemency was devised by Bellori. Unlike Giovan Battista Gaulli’s nave fresco in the nearby church of the Gesu which was being painted at the same time, Maratta did not employ illusionism; his scene remained within its frame and used few figures.

His major works of this period included:  The Appearance of the Virgin to St. Philip Neri (c. 1675) now in the Pitti Palace in Florence; The Virgin with Saints Carlo Borromeo and Ignatius of Loyola, and Angels (c. 1685) for the church of Santa Maria in Vallicella (c. 1675); and The Assumption of the Virgin with Doctors of the Church (1686) for the Cybo Chapel in Santa Maria del Popolo.  It was not, as his critics claimed, numerous depictions of the Virgin that earned him the nickname Carluccio delle Madonne  or ‘Little Carlo of the Madonnas', but his gifted interpretation of this theme.  Other works included an altarpiece, The Death of St Francis Xavier  (1674–79) in the San Francesco Xavier Chapel in the right transept of the Church of the Gesu.

Maratta was a well-known portrait painter. He painted Sacchi (c. 1655, Prado), Cardinal Antonio Barberini (c. 1660 Palazzo Barberini), Pope Clement IX (1669, Vatican Pinacoteca) and a self-portrait (c. 1695, Brussels). He also painted numerous English sitters during their visits to Rome on the Grand Tour, having sketched antiquities for John Evelyn as early as 1645.

In 1679 or 1680, a daughter, Faustina, was born to Maratta by his mistress, Francesca Gommi (or Gomma). He legally recognized her as his daughter in 1698 and upon becoming a widower in 1700, Maratta married the girl's mother. His daughter's features were incorporated into a number of Maratta's late paintings.
 
In 1704, Maratta was knighted by Pope Clement XI.
 
With a general decline in patronage around the beginning of the eighteenth century and largely due to the economic downturn, Maratta turned his hand to painting restoration, including works by Raphael and Carracci.  His sculptural designs included figures of the Apostles for San Giovanni in Laterano. He continued to run his studio into old age even when he could no longer paint. Maratta died in 1713 in Rome, and was buried there in Santa Maria degli Angeli.

See also
List of Carlo Maratta pupils and assistants

Partial anthology of works

Birth of the Virgin, 1643–1645, Church of Saint Clare, Nocera Umbra.
Juno Beseeching Aeolus to Release the Winds Against the Trojan Fleet, 1654–1656, Ackland Art Museum, University of North Carolina at Chapel Hill.
The Triumph of Clemency, 1673–1675, Palazzo Altieri, Rome.
The Virgin and Child in Glory, c.1680, Spanish Royal Collection, National Museum, Madrid
St John the Baptist Explaining the Doctrine of the Immaculate Conception to Sts Gregory, Augustine, and John Chrysostom, 1686, Cybo Chapel, Santa Maria del Popolo, Rome.
Portrait of Clement IX Rospigliosi, 1669, Pinacoteca Gallery, Vatican Museums, Rome.
Saint Joseph and the Infant Christ, Dunedin Public Art Gallery, Dunedin.
Assumption of an Enthroned Virgin, Santa Maria in Vepretis, San Ginesio

Notes

References

External links

 National gallery (UK) web site entry for Carlo Maratta (accessed May 2013)
 WGA site and gallery

1625 births
1713 deaths
People from the Province of Ancona
17th-century Italian painters
Italian male painters
18th-century Italian painters
Italian Baroque painters
Catholic painters
18th-century Italian male artists